Unidentified is a 2006 science fiction Christian film produced by Rich Christiano and Alvin Mount. It was written and directed by Rich Christiano and stars Jonathan Aube, Josh Adamson, Michael Blain-Rozgay, Jenna Bailey, Lance Zitron, and the popular Christian pop rock musician Rebecca St. James. The film deals with UFOs and how they could play into the end times.

Production and release
In May 2005, Rich Christiano wrote, co-produced, and directed the film, his second feature-length movie. Dave Christiano served as story consultant. It was released in theaters in April 2006 under Five & Two Pictures. It was rated PG for thematic elements.

Main cast

Jonathan Aube – Keith
Josh Adamson – Brad
Michael Blain-Rozgay – Darren
Jenna Bailey – Lauren
Lance Zitron – Vince
Rebecca St. James – Colleen

Reception
Reviews were negative. Joe Leyden of Variety wrote "It's not quite awful enough to qualify as camp, which may work against its finding any audience", and credited it with actors with "more sincerity than talent", but a script which "buries its one good idea".
Philip Martin of the Arkansas Democrat-Gazette wrote, "...the cinematic equivalent of a Jack Chick cartoon tract, a modestly artful form of proselytizing," but "one hopes the people who enjoy this sort of thing will find it."

References

Further reading
 (October 25, 2006.) "'Unidentified' explores sightings." Las Cruces Sun-News (archived at Newslibrary.com). Accessed October 2011.
 (October 27, 2006.) "UFO Movie 'Unidentified' Opens." Macon Telegraph (archived at Newslibrary.com). Accessed October 2011.

External links

 Official site
 
 
 Unidentified at Rotten Tomatoes.
 "Unidentified". AllMovie
 Darlington, C.J. . Titletrakk.com.
"Rich Christiano interview". Christian Cinema. December 11, 2006.
 Craigs (March 6, 2007). Unidentified full review. Epinion.com. 
 "Unidentified " details. New York Times. (AllRovi) 

2006 films
2006 independent films
2006 science fiction films
American science fiction films
Films about evangelicalism
Films set in Texas
UFO-related films
2000s English-language films
2000s American films